Kalpnath Rai (4 January 1941 – 6 August 1999) was an Indian politician. He served as a member of the Rajya Sabha between 1974–80, 1980–86, and 1986–92, as well as being elected on four occasions to the Lok Sabha from the Ghosi constituency in the state of Uttar Pradesh. He was a minister in various national Congress (I) governments.

Rai is credited with giving Mau the status of a district during his days as an MP from Ghosi.

Early life 
Rai was born in a Bhumihar family and educated at Gorakhpur University in Uttar Pradesh. He had MA degrees in English and Sociology, as well as a LL.B. degree. He practised as an advocate in the Allahabad High Court.

Political career 
 1963-66 General-Secretary, Samajvadi Yuvjan Sabha, Uttar Pradesh
 1967-69 Executive Member, Samyukta Socialist Party (S.S.P.)
 1969-70 Chairman, National Central Commission, S.S.P.
 1974-76 Member, Executive Committee, Congress Parliamentary Party (Indira) [C.P.P.(I)]
 1974-78 Member, Rajya Sabha
 1978-79 General-Secretary, C.P.P. (I) Member, All India Congress Committee (Indira) [A.I.C.C.(I)]
 June 1980- Joint-Secretary, A.I.C.C. (I)
 1980-81 General-Secretary, A.I.C.C. (I)
 1980 Member, Rajya Sabha (2nd term)
 1982-83 Union Deputy Minister, Parliamentary Affairs; and Industry
 1982-84 Union Minister of State, Parliamentary Affairs
 1986 Member, Rajya Sabha (3rd term)
 1988-89 Union Minister of State, Power
 1989 Elected to 9th Lok Sabha
 Jan. 1990- Member, Committee on Subordinate Legislation
 Aug. 1990 1990-91 Member, Committee on Public Undertakings Member, Consultative Committee, Ministry of Energy
 1991 Re-elected to 10th Lok Sabha (2nd term)
 1991-92 Union Minister of State, Power and Non- Conventional Energy Sources (Independent Charge)
 1992-93 Union Minister of State, Power (Independent Charge)
 1993-94 Union Minister of State, Food (Independent Charge)
 1996 Re-elected to 11th Lok Sabha (3rd term)
 1996-97 Member, Committee on Science and Technology, Environment and Forests
 1998 Re-elected to 12th Lok Sabha (4th term)
 1998-99 Member, Committee on Commerce and its Sub-Committee on Textiles Member, Consultative Committee, Ministry of Finance

Death 

Rai died in Ram Manohar Hospital on 6 August 1999, aged 58, from a heart attack. He was survived by his wife, a son and five daughters.

References

People from Mau district
Indian National Congress politicians
India MPs 1989–1991
India MPs 1991–1996
India MPs 1996–1997
India MPs 1998–1999
Rajya Sabha members from Uttar Pradesh
1999 deaths
Deen Dayal Upadhyay Gorakhpur University alumni
Lok Sabha members from Uttar Pradesh
1941 births
Samata Party politicians
Samyukta Socialist Party politicians